Continuation is the debut solo album by Philip Bailey, released in 1983 on Columbia Records. The album peaked at No. 19 on the US Billboard  Top Soul Albums chart, No. 36 on the Dutch Pop Albums chart and No. 31 on the Swedish Pop Albums chart.

Critical reception

Ross Bossineau of AllMusic said "Expatriate Earth, Wind & Fire vocalist Philip Bailey stepped out on his own with Continuation, his first solo recording. Here Bailey got to explore some less-cluttered grooves than in EWF, and he also sang in his natural tenor rather than being limited to his falsetto." Phyl Garland of Stereo Review wrote "'Continuation,' Bailey's debut solo album, is not as consistently excellent as some of his previous collaborations. There is a somewhat lower level of musical imagination in the material he sings here (some of his own compositions). But the album does demonstrate that he is an artist with a singular and highly polished vocal style who is capable of generating considerable heat through his incisive attack, zestful delivery, and firm professionalism. There's not a sloppy note to be heard here". Martin Basch of the Boston Globe claimed "This Is the rare R&B dance album where each cut is outstanding. Philip Bailey, co-lead vocalist for Earth. Wind and Fire, produced the album which will seduce you with its charm and beat." Sharon Davis of Blues & Soul found that "With George Duke producing and vocal support from Sister Sledge, Jeffrey Osborne, and others, the music here is rich and layered; totally immersing itself into emotional experiences delivered by one of soul music's finest voices." Hugh Wyatt of the New York Daily News stated "The first mistake singer Philip Bailey has made in his first solo album is in using many people associated with Earth, Wind and Fire, the band with whom he has performed as co-lead singer for the last 12 years. Thus, there isn't anything significantly new despite the fact that it's a top-notch recording. Bailey's voice remains one of the most spectacular instruments in contemporary rhythm 'n' blues."

Track listing

Personnel 
 Philip Bailey – rhythm arrangements, lead vocals, backing vocals (1, 2, 3, 5-8), LinnDrum (6), percussion (7)
 George Duke – rhythm arrangements, acoustic piano (1, 3), Prophet-5 (1, 3, 4, 6, 8), Rhodes (3, 4, 6), Moog bass (4), marimba (4), LinnDrum (6), backing vocals (6)
 Robert Brookins – rhythm arrangements (2), Rhodes (2, 7), Minimoog (2, 7) Korg Polysix (2, 7), LinnDrum (7)
 David "Hawk" Wolinski – rhythm arrangements (5, 8), Rhodes (5, 8), Roland Jupiter 8 (5, 8), LinnDrum (5, 8), Roland MC-4 Microcomposer (8)
 Neiman Tillar – sound effects (8)
 Paul Jackson Jr. – guitars (1, 5, 8)
 Michael Sembello – guitars (2, 3, 4)
 David Williams – guitars (6)
 Irvin Kramer – guitars (7)
 Roland Bautista – guitar solo (8)
 Nathan East – bass guitar (1, 6, 8), rhythm arrangements (6)
 Freddie Washington – bass guitar (2, 3)
 James Gadson – drums (1) 
 Ricky Lawson – drums (2, 3, 4)
 Paulinho da Costa – percussion (2, 6, 7)
 David Boruff – alto saxophone solo (5)
 Larry Williams – tenor saxophone (7, 8)
 Lew McCreary – trombone (7, 8)
 Gary Grant – trumpet (7, 8)
 Jerry Hey – trumpet (7, 8), horn arrangements (7, 8)
 George Del Barrio – string arrangements and conductor (2, 3, 7)
 Gerald Vinci – concertmaster (2, 3, 7)
 Bill Hughes – string contractor (2, 3, 7)
 Ron Cooper, Ray Kelley, Earl Madison and Fred Seykora – cello (2, 3, 7)
 Catherine Gottholfer – harp (2, 3, 7)
 Rollice Dale, Pam Goldsmith, Allan Harshman and Dave Schwartz – viola (2, 3, 7)
 Murray Adler, Issy Baker, Brenton Banks, Sherrill Baptist, Tom Buffum, Ron Clark, Ron Folsom, Reg Hill, Marv Limonick, Irma Neuman and Bob Sushel – violin (2, 3, 7)
 Lynn Davis – backing vocals (3)
 Jeffrey Osborne – backing vocals (3)
 Deneice Williams – lead vocals (3)
 Sister Sledge – backing vocals (4)
 Carl Caldwell – backing vocals (5, 7)
 Julius Carey – backing vocals (5, 7)
 Winston Ford – backing vocals (5, 7)

Production 
 Producer – George Duke
 Executive producer – Larkin Arnold
 Production assistant – Cheryl R. Brown
 Recorded and mixing – Tommy Vicari
 Additional engineers – Peter Chaiken and Tom Perry
 Assistant engineers – Steve Crimmel, Kevin Eddy, Mitch Gibson, Barbara Rooney and Nick Spigel
 Recorded at The Complex Studios, Ocean Way Recording and Record Plant (Los Angeles); LeGonks West (West Hollywood, California); Soundcastle (Santa Monica, California)
 Mixed at Soundcastle
 Overdubbed at LeGonks West
 Technician at LeGonks West – Brent Avirill
 Sequencing and editing – Erik Zobler
 Mastering – Brian Gardner at Allen Zentz Mastering (San Clemente, California)
 Design – Lane/Donald
 Photography – Bobby Holland

Charts

References 

1983 debut albums
Philip Bailey albums
Columbia Records albums